is a Japanese TV drama and manga series created and illustrated by Mitsuteru Yokoyama, the creator of Tetsujin 28-go and Giant Robo. The TV drama tells the story of Comet, one of the princesses of the Triangle Nebula who came to Earth in search for the missing prince. The manga is first serialized in Shueisha's monthly Margaret magazine from July to November 1967, marking as one of Japan's first Magical girl series produced.

Plot
The story revolves around Princess Comet, a twelve-year-old girl who is also the princess of the Harmonica Star country of the Triangle Nebula. She was meant to meet the prince of the Tambourine Star country at a ball, but the prince ran away to Earth instead. As it turned out, Comet is sent to Earth to find him, though she has no idea what he looks like. "He will be known by the twinkling in his eyes" is the only clue she was given to the prince's identity. Once she travels to Earth, Comet falls in love with the people she meets there as well as the planet itself, quickly becoming attached to life on Earth. Meanwhile, Princess Meteor learns of Comet's plans to find and marry the prince, so she arrives on Earth in search of the prince, planning to marry him before Comet gets the chance. Both princesses are sent to Earth along with a companion. Comet's companion is a little puppy with a star at the end of his tail named . Meteor's companion is a round, purple bird named .

Unbeknownst to Comet, her Aunt Spica also lives on Earth and had visited Earth before, deciding to stay there and get married herself. The main plot is Comet's tale about her journey to Earth, the people she meets, and her journey to find the prince.

The series is set in Kamakura, Kanagawa, Japan.

Characters 
 Comet (voiced by Aki Maeda in the anime adaptation)

Media

TV Drama
The original Japanese live-action drama was broadcast by Tokyo Broadcasting System in two seasons. The first season aired from July 3, 1967, to December 30, 1968, with a total of 79 episodes. The second season aired from June 12, 1978, to September 24, 1979, with a total of 68 episodes. Both seasons were dubbed into Spanish and broadcast within Mexico, Venezuela, Costa Rica and other Spanish-speaking countries, first season in the 1970s and second season in the 2000s.

Additionally, two actresses (Yumiko Kokonoe and Kumiko Ohba) from the dramas appear in the later anime versions. Bundled with the anime version, the TV drama provides various modules of daily life-related scenarios for the audience, especially the fans of the two actresses that played the main character.

Manga
The Manga adaptation was  serialized in Shueisha's monthly Margaret from July to November 1967, illustrated by Mitsuteru Yokoyama.

Anime
An anime adaptation of the drama series titled  was animated by Nippon Animation, directed by Mamoru Kanbe of Cardcaptor Sakura and written by Akira Okeya of Mobile Suit Gundam: The 08th MS Team. Character designs were done by Kazuaki Makida, who later contributed to the characters designs of Mermaid Melody: Pichi Pichi Pitch. The series premiered on TV Osaka and TV Tokyo from April 1, 2001, to January 27, 2002, with a total of 43 episodes. It was also later aired by Animax, which translated and dubbed the series into English and other languages for broadcast across its network in Hong Kong, Taiwan, South and Southeast Asia. The Anime adapts both the live-action dramas closely with close involvement with Yokoyama himself in redesigning the characters and including new concepts.

The anime has four theme songs. The first ending theme is titled  by Saeko Chiba and the second ending titled  by Sayuri Tanaka. The music is composed by Moka, who later composed the soundtrack of Elfen Lied.

Episode list 
Cosmic Baton Girl Comet-san runs  24 minutes per episode and has 43 episodes.

References

External links
 TV Osaka website  
 TOHO's Official website  
 

2001 anime television series debuts
Japanese drama television series
Japanese television series with live action and animation
Magical girl anime and manga
Mitsuteru Yokoyama
Nippon Animation